Patrick Seeger (born 25 August 1986) is an Austrian footballer who currently plays as a striker for SC Rheindorf Altach.

External links
 

1986 births
Living people
Austrian footballers
SC Austria Lustenau players
FC Lustenau players
SC Rheindorf Altach players
FC Admira Wacker Mödling players
Association football forwards
People from Feldkirch, Vorarlberg
Footballers from Vorarlberg